Fritz Machlup (December 15, 1902 – January 30, 1983) was an Austrian-American economist who was president of the International Economic Association from 1971–1974. He was one of the first economists to examine knowledge as an economic resource, and is credited with popularizing the concept of the information society.

Early life and career
He was born to Jewish parents in Wiener-Neustadt, Austria, near Vienna; his father was a businessman who owned two factories that manufactured cardboard. Machlup earned his doctorate at the University of Vienna.  In 1933, he received a Rockefeller scholarship for the USA and in 1935 became professor at the University of Buffalo. After the Nazi seizure of his homeland Austria in 1938, Machlup stayed in the United States and became a US citizen in 1940.

Machlup's key work was The Production and Distribution of Knowledge in the United States (1962), which is credited with popularizing the concept of the information society.

Machlup was elected to the American Academy of Arts and Sciences in 1961 and the American Philosophical Society in 1963. He was president of the International Economic Association from 1971–1974.

Shortly before his death he completed the third in a series of ten planned volumes collectively called Knowledge: Its Creation, Distribution, and Economic Significance.

Machlup is also credited with forming the Bellagio Group in the early 1960s.  This group was the direct predecessor of the influential Washington-based financial advisory body, the Group of Thirty, which he joined in 1979.

Major works
 Die Goldkernwährung, 1925. (dissertation under Ludwig von Mises)
 "Transfer and Price Effects", 1930, ZfN.
 The Stock Market, Credit and Capital Formation, 1931. (online e-book)
 "The Liquidity of Short-Term Capital", 1932, Economica.
 "A Note on Fixed Costs", 1934, Quarterly Journal of Economics (QJE).
 "Professor Knight and the Period of Production", 1935, Journal of Political Economy (JPE).
 "The Commonsense of the Elasticity of Substitution", 1935, Review of Economic Studies (RES).
  from JSTOR
 "The Rate of Interest as Cost Factor and as a Capitalization Factor", 1935, American Economic Review (AER).
 "Why Bother with Methodology?", 1936, Economica.
 "On the Meaning of Marginal Product", 1937, Explorations in Economics.
 "Monopoly and Competition: A clarification of market positions", 1937, AER.
 "Evaluation of Practical Significance of the Theory of Monopolistic Competition", 1939, AER.
 "Period Analysis and Multiplier Theory", 1939, QJE.
 "The Theory of Foreign Exchange", 1939–40, Economica.
 "Eight Questions on Gold", 1941, AER.
 "Forced or Induced Savings: An exploration into its synonyms and homonyms", 1943, Review of Economics and Statistics (REStat).
 International Trade and the National Income Multiplier, 1943. (online e-book)
 "Marginal Analysis and Empirical Research", 1946, AER.
 "A Rejoinder to an Anti-Marginalist", 1947, AER.
 "Monopolistic Wage Determination as a Part of the General Problem of Monopoly", 1947, in Wage Determination and the Economics of Liberalism.
 "Elasticity Pessimism in International Trade", 1950, Economia Internazionale.
 "Three Concepts of the Balance of Payments and the So-Called Dollar Shortage", 1950, The Economic Journal (EJ).
 "Schumpeter's Economic Methodology", 1951, REStat.
 The Political Economy of Monopoly, 1952 (online e-book).
 "The Characteristics and Classification of Oligopoly", 1952, Kyklos.
 The Economics of Sellers' Competition, 1952 (online e-book).
 "Dollar Shortage and Disparities in the Growth of Productivity", 1954, Scottish JPE.
 "The Problem of Verification in Economics", 1955, Southern EJ.
 "Characteristics and Types of Price Discrimination", 1955, in Stigler, editor, Business Concentration and Price Policies.
 "Relative Prices and Aggregate Spending in the Analysis of Devaluation", 1955, AER.
 "The Inferiority Complex of the Social Sciences", 1956, in Sennholz, editor, On Freedom and Free Enterprise.
 "The Terms-of-Trade Effects of Devaluation upon Real Income and the Balance of Trade", 1956, Kyklos.
 "Professor Hicks' Revision of Demand Theory", 1957, AER.
 "Disputes, Paradoxes and Dilemmas Concerning Economic Development", 1957, RISE.
 "Equilibrium and Disequilibrium: Misplaced concreteness and disguised politics", 1958, EJ.
 "Can There Be Too Much Research?", 1958, Science.
 "Structure and Structural Change: Weaselwords and jargon", 1958, ZfN.
 "The Optimum Lag of Imitation Behind Innovation", 1958, Festskrift til Frederik Zeuthen.
 "Statics and Dynamics: Kaleidoscopic words", 1959, Southern EJ.
 Micro and Macro-Economics: Contested boundaries and claims of superiority, 1960.
 "Operational Concepts and Mental Constructs in Model and Theory Formation", 1960, GdE.
 "The Supply of Inventors and Inventions", 1960, WWA.
 "Another View of Cost-Push and Demand-Pull Inflation", 1960, REStat.
 "Are the Social Sciences Really Inferior?", 1961, Southern EJ.
 The Production and Distribution of Knowledge in the United States, 1962.
 Essays in Economic Semantics, 1963.
 "Conceptos operativos y constructos mentales en la elaboración de los modelos y de la teoría", 1963, Estudios económicos. Bahía Blanca, Argentina.
 "Why Economists Disagree", 1964, Proceedings of APS.
 International Payments, Debts and Gold, 1964.
 "The Cloakroom Rule of International Reserve Creation and Resources Transfer", 1965, QJE.
 "Adjustment, Compensatory Correction and Financing of Imbalances in International Payments", 1965, in Baldwin et al., Trade, Growth and the Balance of Payments.
 "The Need for Monetary Reserves", 1966, Banca Nazionale del Lavoro, Quarterly Review (BNLQR).
 "Operationalism and Pure Theory in Economics", in Krupp, editor, The Structure of Economics.
 "Corporate Management, National Interest and Behavioral Theory", 1967, JPE.
 "Theories of the Firm: Marginalist, behavioral and managerial", 1967, AER.
 "If Matter Could Talk", 1969, in Morgenbesser et al., editors, Philosophy, Science and Methodology.
 "Liberalism and Choice of Freedoms", 1969, in Streissler et al., editors, Roads to Freedom: Essays in honor of Friedrich A. von Hayek.
 "Eurodollar Creation: A mystery story", 1970, BNLQR.
 "Homo Oeconomicus and His Class Mates", 1970, in Natanson, editor, Phenomenology and Social Reality.
 "The Universal Bogey", 1972, in Preston and Corry, editors, Essays in Honor of Lord Robbins.
 "Friedrich von Hayek's Contributions to Economics", 1974, Swedish JE.
 "A History of Thought on Economic Integration", 1977, Columbia University Press.
 "Por qué discrepan los economistas", 1984, Estudios económicos. Bahía Blanca, Argentina.

See also
 Exponential decay – of knowledge

References

External links
 The Fritz Machlup papers at the Hoover Institution Archives.
 The Mont Pelerin Society records at the Hoover Institution Archives.

 

Austrian Jews
Austrian economists
Austrian School economists
1902 births
1983 deaths
20th-century American economists
Presidents of the American Economic Association
Distinguished Fellows of the American Economic Association
New York University faculty
Austrian emigrants to the United States
Member of the Mont Pelerin Society
Members of the American Philosophical Society